Nikolai Nikolayevich Kolesnikov (born 1959) is a Russian scientist who works in the fields of semiconductor and superconductor crystal growth, semiconductor and carbon nanotechnologies.

Kolesnikov graduated from Phys.-Chem. Department of the Moscow Chemico-Technological Institute in 1982 From 1982 to 1993 he worked in the Institute of Solid State Physics and since 1993 has been head of the Laboratory of Physical-Chemical Basis of Crystallisation of the ISSP.

References

1959 births
Russian physical chemists
Russian inventors
Living people